John P. Tanner (born March 17, 1971) is a Canadian former professional ice hockey goaltender who played 21 games in the National Hockey League with the Quebec Nordiques from 1989 to 1992.

External links

References 

1971 births
Living people
Canadian ice hockey goaltenders
Quebec Nordiques draft picks
Quebec Nordiques players
Ice hockey people from Ontario
Sportspeople from Cambridge, Ontario
Peterborough Petes (ice hockey) players
London Knights players
Sudbury Wolves players
Halifax Citadels players
Cornwall Aces players
Rochester Americans players
Wheeling Nailers players
Detroit Falcons (CoHL) players
Muskegon Fury players